Medicosma cunninghamii, commonly known as pinkheart or bonewood, is a species of shrub or small tree in the family Rutaceae and is endemic to eastern Australia. It has simple, narrow oblong to lance-shaped leaves and small white or cream-coloured flowers arranged in small groups.

Description
The leaves are dull green with many small oil dots.

Taxonomy
Pinkheart was first formally described in 1842 by William Jackson Hooker who gave it the name Acronychia cunninghamii and published the description in the Botanical Magazine. The type specimens had been collected by Allan Cunningham near Moreton Bay and grown from seed in Kew Gardens. In 1862, George Bentham and Joseph Dalton Hooker changed the name to Medicosma cunninghamii in Genera Plantarum. The generic name Medicosma is from the Latin, referring to the citrus lemon scent of the leaves. The specific epithet (cunninghamii ) honours the explorer and botanist Allan Cunningham.

Distribution and habitat

Conservation status
This species is classified as of "least concern" under the Queensland Government Nature Conservation Act 1992.

Use in horticulture
Pinkheart is often grown in cultivation. It has a dense form and makes a good screening plant.

References

cunninghamii
Sapindales of Australia
Flora of New South Wales
Flora of Queensland
Plants described in 1842
Taxa named by William Jackson Hooker